1394 Algoa, provisional designation , is a stony asteroid from the inner regions of the asteroid belt, approximately 14 kilometers in diameter. It was discovered on 12 June 1936, by English-born South-African astronomer Cyril Jackson at Union Observatory in Johannesburg, South Africa. The asteroid was named after the historical Algoa Bay.

Orbit and classification 

Algoa orbits the Sun in the inner main-belt at a distance of 2.3–2.6 AU once every 3 years and 10 months (1,391 days). Its orbit has an eccentricity of 0.08 and an inclination of 3° with respect to the ecliptic. These observations, however, remained unused to extend the body's observation arc.

Physical characteristics 

In 2012, two rotational lightcurves of Algoa were obtained at the U.S. Etscorn Observatory, New Mexico, and at the Riverland Dingo Observatory, Australia. They gave a well-defined, concurring rotation period of 2.768 hours with a brightness variation of 0.20 and 0.21 magnitude, respectively. The Collaborative Asteroid Lightcurve Link assumes a standard albedo for stony S-type asteroids of 0.20, and calculates a diameter of 14.2 kilometers with an absolute magnitude of 11.6.

Naming 

This minor planet was named after the historical Algoa Bay, located approximately 700 kilometers east of the Cape of Good Hope, South Africa. The official  was published by the Minor Planet Center in April 1953.

References

External links 
 Asteroid Lightcurve Database (LCDB), query form (info )
 Dictionary of Minor Planet Names, Google books
 Asteroids and comets rotation curves, CdR – Observatoire de Genève, Raoul Behrend
 Discovery Circumstances: Numbered Minor Planets (1)-(5000) – Minor Planet Center
 
 

001394
Discoveries by Cyril Jackson (astronomer)
Named minor planets
19360612